Pia Stadtbäumer (born 1959 in Münster) is a German sculptor. Stadtbäumer is known for her realistic, figurative sculptures.

Stadtbäumer entered the Düsseldorf Academy of Fine Arts in 1981.

Her sculptures are generally made by pouring wax or plastic into plaster moulds. She prefers to work from photographs rather than live models.

References

Further reading 
 Morgan Falconer. "Stadtbäumer, Pia." In Grove Art Online. Oxford Art Online, (accessed February 19, 2012; subscription required).

External links 
 Entry for Pia Stadtbäumer on the Union List of Artist Names
 Biography of Pia Stadtbäumer at the Galerie Weingand
 

1959 births
Living people
21st-century German women artists
German sculptors
German women sculptors
People from Münster
Kunstakademie Düsseldorf alumni